Patrik César dos Santos Duzi, known as Pety or simply Patrik (born 12 March 1988 in Franca, São Paulo), is a Brazilian retired footballer who played as an attacking midfielder.

Honours
Copa São Paulo de Futebol Júnior: 2007

External links

1988 births
Living people
Footballers from São Paulo (state)
Brazilian footballers
Association football midfielders
Campeonato Brasileiro Série A players
Santos FC players
Uberaba Sport Club players
Esporte Clube São Bento players
Oeste Futebol Clube players